Bronin is a surname. Notable people with the surname include:

Luke Bronin (born 1979), American politician and lawyer
Sara Bronin, American lawyer, professor, and architect